Woodbury is the name of some places in the U.S. state of New York:
Woodbury, Nassau County, New York, on Long Island
Woodbury, Orange County, New York, in the Hudson Valley

See also 
Woodbury (disambiguation)